WNAU (1470 AM) is a radio station broadcasting an oldies music format. Licensed to New Albany, Mississippi, United States.  The station is currently owned by Mpm Investment Group.

References

External links

Oldies radio stations in the United States
NAU